National Route 382 is a national highway of Japan connecting Tsushima, Nagasaki and Karatsu, Saga in Japan, with a total length of 125.2 km (77.8 mi). The highway includes segments on the islands of Tsushima and Iki, as well on Kyushu.

References

382
Roads in Nagasaki Prefecture
Roads in Saga Prefecture